Francisco Bustamante (c. 1680–1737) was a Spanish painter.

Bustamante was born at Oviedo, and studied painting with Miguel Jacinto Menendez at Madrid. On the ceiling of the sacristy of Oviedo Cathedral he painted a fresco representing 'The Assumption of the Blessed Virgin,' from a sketch sent from Rome; also a series for the cloister of the Franciscans. He excelled in portraiture; his likenesses, executed with fidelity and skill, are to be met with in the best houses of the Asturias. He died in Oviedo.

References
 

18th-century Spanish painters
18th-century Spanish male artists
Spanish male painters
Painters from Asturias
Fresco painters

People from Oviedo
1680s births
1737 deaths
Year of birth uncertain